Judge Dredd is a light gun shooter video game developed by Gremlin Interactive, based on the comic book of the same name. It was published by Acclaim Entertainment for the arcades, and for the PlayStation by Gremlin Interactive in Europe and Activision in North America, respectively. The PlayStation emulated version was re-released by Urbanscan for the PlayStation Network on 24 January 2008.

Gameplay
Judge Dredd is a light gun game set in the 22nd century, where Judge Dredd fights an ex-judge prison escapee, who kidnapped the mayor, and his army of merciless androids. The gameplay is similar to Area 51 and Maximum Force with some elements from Time Crisis, in that the game's full motion video is integrated with the action.

Reception
Next Generation reviewed the PlayStation version of the game, rating it one star out of five, and stated that "in an all too common display of galling disrespect toward gamers by the videogame industry, a major publisher like Activision has once again tried to slip a gaming travesty past an unsuspecting public."

William Schiffmann for the Sun Journal of Lewiston, Maine, said that "if you like shooting gallery games, this is a fine example of the genre".

Reviews
NowGamer (Nov 23, 1997)
PSM (May, 1998)
Game Revolution (May, 1998)
GameSpot (Apr 08, 1998)
IGN (Apr 01, 1998)

Notes

References

External links 

1997 video games
Acclaim Entertainment games
Activision games
Android (robot) video games
Arcade video games
Cooperative video games
Criminal law video games
Cyberpunk video games
Fiction about prison escapes
Full motion video based games
Games based on Judge Dredd
Gremlin Interactive games
Hostage taking in fiction
Kidnapping in fiction
Law enforcement in fiction
Light gun games
PlayStation (console) games
PlayStation Network games
Post-apocalyptic video games
Rail shooters
Superhero video games
Video games about police officers
Video games about terrorism
Video games based on comics
Video games developed in the United Kingdom
Video games set in the 22nd century
Video games with pre-rendered 3D graphics